Stephen Wight (born Stephen Gray; 27 February 1980) is an English actor. He was nominated for a Laurence Olivier Award for his performance in the 2007 production of the play Dealer's Choice, and had a minor role as Ben in the British drama I May Destroy You.

Career

Wight's television career dates back to 2003 with a minor part in Casualty. He is best known for his role as Phil to David Jason's Des in Diamond Geezer (Granada television series from March 2005). Diamond Geezer was the second time Wight had worked alongside Jason, having appeared in a 2003 instalment of  A Touch of Frost, playing Ritchie Mason in Another Life. He starred in the BBC TV show Coming of Age in Series 2 Episode 3, as the character Horace. He made his National Theatre debut at the Cottesloe in 2004 in a re-cast revival of Sing Yer Heart Out For the Lads.  He also had a role as Felix in the TV series Hex.

At the Evening Standard Theatre Awards in November 2007, Wight won the Milton Shulman Award for Outstanding Newcomer for his performances in Don Juan in Soho at the Donmar Warehouse and in the revival of Patrick Marber's Dealer's Choice at the Menier Chocolate Factory in Southwark, which subsequently transferred to the Trafalgar Studios in Whitehall. He appeared as Stuart the rent boy in Alan Bennett's play The Habit of Art, about an imagined meeting between poet W.H. Auden and composer Benjamin Britten.

In December 2009, Wight played Danny in Episode Four (Series One) of the E4 television series Misfits. In late 2010 he starred as a series regular in two BBC sitcoms, playing Joe in The Great Outdoors, then Skoose in the Alan Davies sitcom  Whites. In 2014, he appeared in the Channel 4 sitcom Lovesick. He reprised the role on Netflix in 2016.

From November 2011, Wight played Harry Robinson in the London West End production of The Ladykillers at the Gielgud theatre, alongside Ben Miller and Peter Capaldi. He appeared in Episode Two, Series Two of the BBC TV drama Sherlock, "The Hounds of Baskerville". He was also in the 2011 sitcom Threesome as Mitch, one of the three main characters, and opposite Emun Elliott, with whom he also co-starred in the 2012 drama series The Paradise. He played Lance Corporal Simon Lansley in three series of the BBC Three comedy Bluestone 42, between 2013 and 2015.

In 2015, Wight originated the title role in the play McQueen at the St. James Theatre, London.

In 2016, he voiced Ludovico in Hattie Naylor's adaptation of The Mysteries of Udolpho, broadcast on BBC Radio 4.

Credits

References

External links
A short biography and filmography of Stephen Wight

Ealing comedy The Ladykillers reborn on the stage

1980 births
Living people
British male television actors
British male stage actors